Bagendon is a village and civil parish in the Cotswold district of Gloucestershire, England, about four miles north of Cirencester.  According to the 2001 census it had a population of 265,decreasing to 239 at the 2011 census.

St Margaret's Church
The Church of England parish church, St Margaret's, a Grade I listed building dedicated probably either to St Margaret of Antioch or to St Margaret of Scotland, is “an attractive and interesting little church, often subjected to flooding". The church building is partly Norman, but the chancel, south door and porch, the windows in the nave, and the diagonal buttresses of the tower date to between about 1460 and 1470.

People
The novelist Hilda Gregg was born here in 1868.

See also
George Edward Rees, History of Bagendon (T.Hailing Ltd, 1932)

References

External links
 
 Bagendon Parish Council

Villages in Gloucestershire
Cotswold District